Phyllocoptes is a genus of acari, including the following species:
 Phyllocoptes abaenus Keifer, 1940
 Phyllocoptes adalius Keifer, 1939
 Phyllocoptes alniborealis Liro, 1950
 Phyllocoptes alniincanae Roivainen, 1947
 Phyllocoptes amaranthi Corti, 1917
 Phyllocoptes amygdali Bagdasarian, 1972
 Phyllocoptes atragenes Liro, 1941
 Phyllocoptes azaleae Nalepa, 1904
 Phyllocoptes coprosmae Lamb, 1952
 Phyllocoptes eupadi Newkirk 1984
 Phyllocoptes fructiphilus Keifer  causes rose rosette disease
 Phyllocoptes goniothorax (Nalepa) causes galls on Crataegus species
 Phyllocoptes hazelae Manson, 1984
 Phyllocoptes malinus (Nalepa, 1892) causes galls on Malus species
 Phyllocoptes metrosideri Manson, 1989
 Phyllocoptes populi (Nalepa)

References

Eriophyidae
Taxa named by Alfred Nalepa
Trombidiformes genera